The Institute of Living is a comprehensive psychiatric facility in Hartford, Connecticut, that offers care across the spectrum of psychiatric services, including:

 A 24/7 crisis evaluation telephone assessment and triage: Experienced psychiatric nurses and clinicians collect, assess, and synthesize clinical, medical, psychosocial and other collateral data to ensure that the patient is referred to the appropriate level of care.
 Inpatient psychiatric units for adults, geriatrics, teens, and children.
 Group homes for adults: Eli's Retreat and the Todd House provide treatment and support independent life skills.
 Specialized school programs for teens and children: The Webb Schools in Hartford and Cheshire provide a comprehensive array of services to public schools, ranging from in-district consultations to student enrollments.
 Partial hospitalization (PHP) and intensive outpatient programs (IOP) for older adults, adults, young adults, teens, and children.
 The Medication Assisted Treatment Close to Home (MATCH) program uses a combination of medication and therapy to help people into recovery from addiction to opioids, alcohol or other drugs

History 
The hospital was built in 1823 and was opened to patients in 1824. At that time, the Institute of Living (IOL) was among only four facilities of its kind in the nation. It was capable of accommodating 40 to 60 patients who were segregated by "sex, nature of disease, habits of life and the wishes of their friends." The weekly cost of care was $3 for Connecticut residents, $4 for those from out of state and $10 to $12 for a suite with an exclusive personal attendant. Eli Todd was its first director.  The hospital's 35 acres (14 ha) campus was landscaped by Frederick Law Olmsted in the 1860s.

The hospital was initially called the Connecticut Retreat for the Insane. Its name changed several times, but it was often referred to as the Hartford Retreat.

Dr. C. Charles Burlingame was named as superintendent in 1939. His vision was for the facility to become one-third hospital, one-third university/educational environment and one-third resort. This included adding residential cottages, a nine-hole golf course, indoor and outdoor pools and tennis courts, all of which are gone today.

In the late 1980s, the IOL staffed 450 beds, with many patients staying for months and years until managed care transformed the facility to what it is today. By the early 1990s, the IOL reduced its number of beds to 150 and length of stay to 28 days.

The IOL and Hartford Hospital's Department of Psychiatry merged in 1994, and the next year saw a blending of programs, staffs, ideals and goals. As a result of the merger, the IOL could accept Medicaid patients, something private psychiatric hospitals in the United States cannot do. New programs such as the Schizophrenia Rehabilitation Program (focusing on cognitive rehabilitation), Anxiety Disorders Center, Early Psychosis Program and LGBTQ offerings, among many others, reshaped the IOL's clinical landscape.

During its 175th anniversary, the Institute of Living opened an exhibition titled "Myths, Minds and Medicine" on the history of the Institute and psychiatric treatment in general.

As it approaches its bicentennial in 2022, Dr Javeed Sukhera was announced as the Institute of Living’s incoming Chair and Chief of Psychiatry in 2021.

Historic grounds 
Rare or unusually large tree species make up the IOL grounds, ever since they were redesigned by Frederick Law Olmsted and his associate, Jacob Weidenmann.

There are several New England champion trees on the grounds, including the Ginkgo, which is also one of the biggest in the United States, the pecan, the bur oak and the Japanese Zelkova.

On August 4, 2020, the pecan tree was destroyed by Tropical Storm Isaias. The pecan tree, in the middle of the central lawn, was one of two in Connecticut and was a New England champion for 30 years until a lightning strike caused significant damage a decade ago. There is evidence to suggest that the pecan tree predates Olmsted.

Locations 
Olin Neuropsychiatry Research Center was founded in 2001. The mission of the center is to be at the forefront of research in brain disorders.

The Anxiety Disorders Center provides treatments and researches the nature and treatment of anxiety to educate mental health professionals in research and treatment.

The Family Resource Center provides education, support, referral services, and treatment to persons or families dealing with a significant mental illness.

The Burlingame Clinical Trials Unit conducts pharmaceutical trials.

Training programs 
The Institute of Living supports multiple training programs. These include a general adult psychiatry residency, a child and adolescent psychiatry fellowship, a psychosomatic medicine fellowship, an Advanced Practice Nurse Fellowship, and a psychology internship and post-doctoral training program. The IOL also offers clinical rotations for medical students, social work students, and nursing students, among others.

 5-Year Combined Adult & Child/Adolescent Psychiatry Residency Training Program
 Adult Psychiatry Residency Training Program
 Child & Adolescent Psychiatry Residency Training Program
 Psychosomatic Medicine Fellowship
 Psychology Department Internship & Residency
 Advanced Practice Nurse Fellowship

Controversies 

The Institute of Living was one of the primary treatment centers in the United States for Catholic priests, including those who sexually abused children. The Institute treated hundreds of priests over the course of several decades.  Many priests were transferred to the institute to avoid discovery and prosecution.  The Institute of Living maintains it was deceived by the Catholic Church, that the Church concealed information from doctors, and that it bears no responsibility for the conspiracy to perpetuate priest abuse. The Archdiocese of Baltimore sent priest Joseph Maskell for treatment at the institute from 1992 to 1993.

Abuse 
It was here that Gene Tierney was subjected to 26 shock treatments, which she later claimed robbed her of significant portions of her memory.

The institute treated silent movie star Clara Bow 
after she attempted suicide in 1944 and checked into The Institute of Living, in 1949, where she underwent electro-shock therapy and was diagnosed with schizophrenia.

Marsha Linehan, the creator of dialectical behavior therapy, was diagnosed with schizophrenia at the Institute of Living and subjected to involuntary electroshock therapy and seclusion when she was a teenager, according to a June 2011 New York Times article.

Linehan has returned to the IOL at least twice, once to give a Grand Rounds presentation on Dialectical Behavior Therapy, and another to share her experience as a patient at the IOL.

Notes

References

Further reading

Buildings and structures in Hartford, Connecticut
Hospital buildings completed in 1823
Psychiatric hospitals in Connecticut
1823 establishments in the United States